Eulithidium bellum, common name the shouldered pheasant shell, is a species of sea snail, a marine gastropod mollusk in the family Phasianellidae.

Description
Th height of the shell varies between 2 mm and 6 mm.

Distribution
This species occurs in the Gulf of Mexico, the Caribbean Sea and the Lesser Antilles; in the Atlantic Ocean off Southern Brazil.

References

 Adams, C. B. 1845. Specierum novarum conchyliorum, in Jamaica repertorum, synopsis. Proceedings of the Boston Society of Natural History 2: 1–17. 
 Reeve, L. 1857. Monograph of the genus Littorina. Conchologia Iconica 10: pls. 1-16 
 Weisbord, N. E. 1962. Late Cenozoic gastropods from northern Venezuela. Bulletins of American Paleontology 42(193): 672 pp., 48 pls.
 Nordsieck, F. 1973. Genus Tricolia Risso 1826 in the European Seas. La Conchiglia 5(55-56): 3–10.
 Abbott R. T. (1974). American Seashells. The marine mollusca of the Atlantic and Pacific coast of North America. II edit. Van Nostrand, New York 663 p. + 24 pl: page(s): 62
 Turgeon, D.D., et al. 1998. Common and scientific names of aquatic invertebrates of the United States and Canada. American Fisheries Society Special Publication 26 page(s): 59
 Rosenberg, G., F. Moretzsohn, and E. F. García. 2009. Gastropoda (Mollusca) of the Gulf of Mexico, Pp. 579–699 in Felder, D.L. and D.K. Camp (eds.), Gulf of Mexico–Origins, Waters, and Biota. Biodiversity. Texas A&M Press, College Station, Texas

External links
 

Phasianellidae
Gastropods described in 1937